Jorge Cruickshank García (July 29, 1911 – January 1989) was a Mexican politician. He was the general secretary of the Popular Socialist Party and a five-time parliamentarian.

Early life and activism
Jorge Cruickshank was born in Tehuantepec in the state of Oaxaca. He attended primary and secondary education in Veracruz. He continued studies in the city, and obtained engineering and secondary teaching degrees. He became active in the communist youth movement, and between 1939-1940 was a national leader of the Communist Youth. He was also a trade union organizer. He took part in the founding of Sindicato Nacional de Trabajadores de la Educación (SNTE), and became the general secretary of SNTE local 10 in 1943. He later held various positions in the SNTE national organization.

In the PPS
In 1948 he took part in founding the Popular Party (which later became the Popular Socialist Party, PPS). He was a Popular Party candidate for parliament in the 1949 election. In 1958 he again stood for parliament. In 1960 he was included in the Central Committee of the party (a position he would hold until 1982). He was the PPS Secretary for International Relations during 1962-1963. 1963-1965 he served as Secretary of Press and Publicity of the party 1963-1965 and Secretary of Organization 1965-1968. In 1968 he was the PPS candidate for governor of Oaxaca.

General secretary
Cruickshank was elected general secretary of PPS at the fourth national assembly of the party in January 1969. His candidature was opposed by a group of former POCM leaders, who were expelled at the meeting.

Cruickshank García served as PPS general secretary 1969-1979, 1979-1981.

Parliamentarian
In 1964 he was elected to the federal parliament (as a PPS candidate from electoral district 1, Oaxaca). His tenure lasted until 1967. In the parliament, he formed part in committees on culture, railroads and communications. In 1970 he was re-elected to parliament for the 1970-1973 tenure.

In 1976 he was elected to the Senate from Oaxaca. He became the first Mexican senator not to come from the Institutional Revolutionary Party (PRI) since the consolidation of that party's rule in 1929. He had been elected unopposed. It was speculated at the time that PRI had supported Cruickshank García's candidature in return for the acceptance of the PPS to concede defeat in the 1975 Nayarit gubernatorial election (it was believed that PPS had won the governor's post in Nayarit, but lost it due to fraud). It would take until 1988 before more opposition politicians would be elected to the Senate.

Cruickshank's senatorial tenure lasted until 1982. In that year he was re-elected to the lower house of parliament. He became the coordinator of the parliamentary faction of the PPS. He was re-elected in 1988.

References

1911 births
1989 deaths
Politicians from Oaxaca
Popular Socialist Party (Mexico) politicians
Mexican trade unionists
Members of the Chamber of Deputies (Mexico)
Members of the Senate of the Republic (Mexico)
20th-century Mexican politicians